The Cardiff School of Journalism, Media and Culture (JOMEC) is Cardiff University's school for training in media. It is one of the journalism schools whose main universities are part of the Russell Group. It was founded as the Cardiff Journalism School in 1970 by Sir Tom Hopkinson and is the longest established postgraduate centre of journalism education in Europe.  The school is considered to be one of the best training centres for journalists, and is described as the "Oxbridge of journalism".

The school is based in a new building in Central Square, having transferred in Cathays Park in September 2018. The head of the school is Professor Stuart Allan, and the current director of the Centre of Journalism Studies is Professor Richard Sambrook, former director of BBC World Service and Global News.

The school is also home to Cardiff University's Centre for Community Journalism (C4CJ) which developed the world's first  Massive Open Online Course (MOOC) on community journalism. The centre is now responsible for running the UK's only representative body for community and hyperlocal publishers: The Independent Community News Network (ICNN).

Move to Central Square
The school was formerly housed in the Bute Building of the university's Cathays Park campus. In September 2018 it moved to 2 Central Square, north of Cardiff Central railway station and adjacent to New Broadcasting House, the headquarters of BBC Cymru Wales. The school has agreed to take  in the building. The layout and interior of the building were designed by  Architects IBI and includes a 300-seat lecture theatre, six newsrooms, editing suites, and TV and radio studios. C4CJ will also be moving.

Degree programmes
Bachelor of Arts
Master of Arts
Postgraduate Diploma in Journalism
PhD & MPhil
MBA Media Management
MSc Computational and Data Journalism
MA International Public Relations and Global Communications Management

Notable alumni

Honorary members and visiting fellows
Carl Bernstein, American journalist known for his investigation of the Watergate scandal
Huw Edwards, television journalist, newsreader and presenter
Alan Rusbridger, former editor-in-chief of The Guardian

See also
 List of tallest buildings in Cardiff

References

External links
Cardiff School of Journalism, Media and Culture

Journalism schools in the United Kingdom
Cardiff University
University departments in Wales
1970 establishments in Wales
Educational institutions established in 1970